Curse Of The Witching Tree is a 2015 British independent horror film, written and directed by James Crow. The film was his debut feature. It was filmed in the South East of England, in the county of Kent. It stars Sarah Rose Denton, Lucy Clarvis and Lawrence Weller, also starring Danielle Bux as the eponymous witch Isobel Redwood. Production on the film began in May 2014, and was released on DVD in the United Kingdom on 18 May 2015 and 19 May 2015 in the United States.

Summary
An innocent woman, accused of murdering her son and hanged as a witch, curses a tree and the children who play around it. The effects of this act of revenge echo through the years and centuries, and restless spirits haunt the house where the bodies of the cursed children have been buried. A family move into their new home, and begin to uncover the terrible truth behind The Witching Tree and the murdered children upon which they unknowingly sleep.

Plot

Cast 
 Sarah Rose Denton - Amber Thorson
 Lucy Clarvis - Emma Thorson
 Lawrence Weller - Jake Thorson
 Jon Campling - Father Flanagan
 Danielle Bux - Isobel Redwood
 Caroline Boulton - Eva
 Lydia Breden-Thorpe - Lily
 Ben Greaves-Neil - Merrick

Reception  
Starburst Magazine gave the film 7/10 stars, and reviewer John Townsend stated "Curse Of The Witching Tree displays a clear understanding of the horror genre while demonstrating an ability to bring a recognisable yet different approach to the age old theme of witchcraft". while Haddonfield Horror writer David Martin called the film a "masterpiece" and said the film "is going to be labelled a modern day cult classic", and was hailed as better than The Conjuring by one reviewer. While others criticized the low budget nature of the film and gratuitous use of jump scares and inclusion of heavy drama from the main characters. Reviewers were divided on the cast with many praising the quality of child acting, with others relating it to children's programming.

References

External links 

2015 films
2015 horror films
British supernatural horror films
Films about curses
Films about trees
Films about witchcraft
2010s English-language films
Films directed by James Crow
2010s British films